Atel Mohammed is a village in the southern Kandahar province of Afghanistan. During Operation Warrior Sweep of the U.S. invasion of Afghanistan the inhabitants hid their Qur'ans and other religious tokens fearing the United States soldiers would harm them if they realised they were Muslim, these fears were soon quelled.

See also
Kandahar Province

Populated places in Kandahar Province